Clea Lake or Lough Clea is situated just outside Keady in County Armagh, Northern Ireland. It provides water for the Keady area and is a popular fishing location in south Armagh.

Lakes of County Armagh